Aldona Margenytė is a retired Lithuanian rower who won two European titles in the eights event in 1963 and 1965. One of these titles was a gold medal in the 1963 European Rowing Championships.

References

See also
1963 European Rowing Championships (women)

Year of birth missing (living people)
Living people
Lithuanian female rowers
Soviet female rowers
European Rowing Championships medalists